Harold Wallace Smith Jr. (born October 3, 1935) is a former American football player who played with the Boston Patriots, Denver Broncos, and Oakland Raiders. He played college football at the University of California, Los Angeles.

References

1935 births
Living people
American football defensive tackles
Boston Patriots players
Denver Broncos (AFL) players
Oakland Raiders players
UCLA Bruins football players
Players of American football from Santa Monica, California